Aclytia hoffmannsi is a moth of the family Erebidae. It was described by Rothschild in 1912. It is found in Peru.

References

Moths described in 1912
Aclytia
Moths of South America